Loscopia is a genus of moths of the family Noctuidae.

Species
 Loscopia roblei Quinter & Lafontaine, 2009
 Loscopia velata (Walker, 1865)

References
Natural History Museum Lepidoptera genus database

Noctuidae